The 2008–09 NCAA Division III men's ice hockey season began on October 17, 2008 and concluded on March 21 of the following year. This was the 36th season of Division III college ice hockey.

Regular season

Season tournaments

Standings

Note: Mini-game are not included in final standings

2009 NCAA Tournament

Note: * denotes overtime period(s)

See also
 2008–09 NCAA Division I men's ice hockey season

References

External links

 
NCAA